Nerkonda Paarvai is a 2019 Indian Tamil-language legal drama film directed by H. Vinoth. Produced by Boney Kapoor, it is a remake of the Hindi film Pink (2016). The film stars Ajith Kumar, Shraddha Srinath, Abhirami Venkatachalam and Andrea Tariang (reprising her role from the original). It also features Arjun Chidambaram, Adhik Ravichandran, Aswin Rao, Rangaraj Pandey, Sujith Shankar, Delhi Ganesh, and Jayaprakash in pivotal roles. Nirav Shah is the cinematographer of the film, while Gokul Chandran is the editor.

The film's soundtrack and score was composed by Yuvan Shankar Raja and was released under the label of Zee Music Company. The film was released theatrically on 8 August 2019 to positive reviews from critics. It grossed  crore worldwide.

Plot
Meera Krishnan, Famitha Banu and Andrea Tariang are three independent young women living in Chennai who are best friends. One night, they happen to attend a party, enjoying themselves. On the other hand, rich boys Vishwa and Venkatesh take their friend, an injured Adhik Ramajayam, to the hospital. Adhik had been hit in the head and is bleeding profusely. However, the boys decide not to file a police complaint. Meanwhile, the women hurriedly return home from the party, agitated over something, but they try to forget it and carry on with their lives.

During her morning exercise, Meera is observed by Bharath Subramaniam, a grim man living in their neighbourhood who was a successful lawyer and a loving husband to his wife Kalyani years ago. Kalyani had died due to pregnancy complications when Bharath had to leave her alone at home due to an important case. This causes Bharath to break down mentally and retire from his profession, coping up with his depression through the use of medications. Bharath senses from the look on Meera's face that something unpleasant had been going on in her life. Later, Meera files a complaint against Adhik and his friend as they had started causing misery in her friends' lives. Learning of this, Adhik orchestrates a gang to kidnap Meera and molest her, while threatening her to withdraw the complaint. She is later dropped back at home, but is arrested the next day on charges of prostitution and attempted murder by Adhik.

Bharath learns of Meera's plight from her friends and fights the gang that aided Adhik's friends, capturing the main goon and handing him over to the police. He also returns to his profession by offering to help the women by representing them in their case. Soon a case is filed. Adhik's side is represented by Sathyamoorthy.

Sathyamoorthy presents the events from Adhik's allegations that Meera and her friends were encountered by Adhik and his friends who then slept with them after having drinks. Adhik is hit on the head by Meera as a result of nonpayment, labelling the women as prostitutes. He bases this on the fact that Meera has a family but lives alone, Famitha having a relationship with an older man, and Andrea moving to Chennai from North India. Meera and her friends deny the allegations and state that the men tried to sexually assault them, prompting Meera to hit Adhik on the head with a bottle in self-defense.

Bharath represents the women and bases their statement on the fact that a woman has the right to say no. Bharath and Sathyamoorthy question the witnesses and the women individually in the subsequent days, with Bharath's investigation proving successful in favour of the women. Towards the end of the trial, Bharath questions Adhik, who arrogantly says that "girls born in good families don't party or drink." Bharath, however, holds a photo of Adhik's sister attending a party and having drinks in the courtroom, causing Adhik to lose his cool and curse Meera and her friends, stating that they "reaped what they sowed." Consequently, he blurts out that he tried to rape Meera, shocking Sathyamoorthy. Bharath concludes the case by criticising the regressed views of the society where women are stereotyped as prostitutes if they come home late, yearn to be independent, drink and so on, but men are not affected by this.

The case ends with Adhik and his friends getting arrested.

Cast 

 Ajith Kumar as Adv. Bharath Subramaniam
 Shraddha Srinath as Meera Krishnan
 Abhirami Venkatachalam as Famitha Banu
 Andrea Tariang as Andrea Tariang
 Vidya Balan as Kalyani Bharath (special appearance)
 Arjun Chidambaram as Adhik
 Adhik Ravichandran as Vishwa
 Aswin Rao as Venkatesh 
 Rangaraj Pandey as Adv. Sathyamoorthy
 Sujith Shankar as Gavaskar
 Delhi Ganesh as Krishnan
 Jayaprakash as Ramajayam
 D. Ramachandran as the Judge
 Junior Balaiah as Junior
 Uday Mahesh as Commissioner Deepak
 Dinesh Prabhakar as Inspector Kandhasamy
 Sittrarasu as Kathiravan
 Priyadarshini Rajkumar as Meera's senior colleague
 Kishen Das as Andrea's friend
 Kalki Koechlin as herself in the song "Kaalam" 
 Yunohoo as herself in the song "Kaalam"

Production 
The film was officially launched on 7 December 2018 with a formal pooja in Chennai. Actress Vidya Balan is making her Tamil debut with this film and will be paired with Ajith. This film is a remake of Amitabh Bachchan's  Pink. The film producers said that the shooting will start from February 2019 and will hit the theatre screens on 8 August 2019. In January 2019 Kannada actress Shraddha Srinath was finalised to play the role that Taapsee Pannu played in the original version. The film will also have Abhirami Venkatachalam. Andrea Tariang, who was also part of the original film, will reprise her role. It is revealed that Ajith Kumar's 60th film will also be a team-up with Boney Kapoor and will be directed by H. Vinoth once again. Shooting was wrapped up in early April 2019.

Music

The soundtrack album is scored by Yuvan Shankar Raja in his first collaboration with director H. Vinoth. All the songs were released as singles. The soundtrack rights for the movie were acquired by Zee Music Company.

Reception

Box office 
The film has done very well in Tamil Nadu and in Chennai. It grossed  6.70 crore in the first five days in Chennai itself. The film collected  in Tamil Nadu in 4 days and  worldwide in opening weekend. It collected  in Tamil Nadu,  in Karnataka,  in Kerala and  overseas. The Times of India published that Nerkonda Paarvai made  worldwide, whereas Firstpost stated that the film ended its run with  worldwide.

Critical response
Nerkonda Paarvai received highly positive reviews from critics. We Magazine gave the film 4 out of 5 stars stating "Vinoth has done well to keep the fans engaged. Especially, in the second half of the movie, the courtroom scenes. On the whole, the movie stays true to its original, stays relevant to the current situation. We already know that this movie will be a huge hit and with Ajith as the lead, things only have got better. Once again, huge applause for Ajith. For his acting, for selecting a plot like this." Hindustan Times gave 4 out of 5 stars stating "Ajith and Shraddha Srinath starrer is one of the most socially relevant films to come out of Tamil film industry. Also, it mostly remains true to the story of its Hindi original". Deccan Chronicle gave 4 out of 5 stars stating "A man of Ajith's stature is bound to create ripples in the media and the messages get spread far and wide". The Times of India gave 3.5 out of 5 stars stating "With arresting performances of artistes and an engaging screenplay which touch upon a sensitive issue, H Vinoth manages to stay true to the original version". Firstpost gave 3.5 out of 5 stars stating "Nerkonda Paarvai is Ajith's best movie in recent times and deserves a watch for its daring theme and presentation".
Behindwoods gave 3.25 out of 5 stars stating "Ajith sheds his mass image and effectively delivers a film with a strong social message". The Indian Express gave 3 out of 5 stars stating "Nerkonda Paarvai is a timely film that could significantly contribute to sensitising people to the plight of the victims of sexual violence. When a big star like Ajith says 'No means No', the impact of the punchline on the audience could be immediate and stronger than what Amitabh Bachchan achieved when he said it the first time." News18 gave 2.5 out of 5 stars stating "A Superbly Subdued Ajith Gets the Film Up and Flying". Baradwaj Rangan of Film Companion South wrote "In a sense, Nerkonda Paarvai is a companion piece to Viswasam. Once again, Ajith redeems himself by saving a woman after failing to protect one. It's an admirable admission of vulnerability for a megastar...as Bharath, Ajith gives one of his best performances. He is subdued, dignified—like the courtroom scenes".

Home media
The film became available as VOD on ZEE5 on 19 September 2019, and saw a DVD release in India, the United Kingdom, France, Germany, and Japan.

References

External links 
 

2010s legal drama films
2010s Tamil-language films
2019 films
Films about social issues in India
Films about women in India
Films scored by Yuvan Shankar Raja
Indian courtroom films
Tamil remakes of Hindi films
Indian feminist films
Indian legal drama films
Films directed by H. Vinoth